California is the third album by Gianna Nannini and was released in 1979. The album, a rock record - with the single "America" – took her straight to the top of the charts in Germany and Northern Europe in 1980. The album went platinum in Italy and gold in Germany, Switzerland and Austria.

Track listing
All songs by Gianna Nannini except as noted.
"America" – 4:20
"California" – 8:14
"Good Bye My Heart" – 6:19
"Io e Bobby McGee" (Cover version of "Me and Bobby McGee") (Kris Kristofferson / Fred Foster / Gianna Nannini) - 4:38
"Sognami" – 4:01
"La lupa e le stelle" – 4:08
"Lei" – 5:44

Personnel 
 Walter Calloni	- Drums, Percussion
 Dino d'Antonio	- Bass
 Kris Kristofferson	- Composer
 Gianna Nannini	- Composer, Piano, Primary Artist, Vocals
 Mauro Paoluzzi	- Composer, Guitar
 Claudio Pascoli	- Saxophone
 	- Keyboards
 Michelangelo Romano	- Producer

External links
 Gianna Nannini homepage

1979 albums
Gianna Nannini albums